Ouvrage L'Agaisen is a work (gros ouvrage) of the Maginot Line's Alpine extension, the Alpine Line, also known as the Little Maginot Line. The ouvrage consists of one entry block, two artillery blocks and one observation block above Sospel. Additional blocks were planned but not built. The position fired 1821 shots from Block 3's 75mm gun turret in 1940. It has an unusual 75mm gun turret in Block 3.

The ouvrage was built between 1930 and 1935, and was equipped from 1935 to 1937. L'Agaisen possesses an instruction casemate that was used to allow soldiers to practice attack and defense skills.

Description
Ouvrage l'Agaisen was built between November 1930 and December 1934, beginning with a contractor named Marting and completed by Roussel.  The construction cost was 24.6 million francs, of which 2.7 million francs were for the access road. The underground galleries run parallel with the ridge, the barracks under the summit. Block 4, an observation block, is at the extreme east end of the ridge.
Block 1 (entry): one machine gun cloche, one grenade launcher cloche and two machine gun embrasures.
Block 2 (artillery): one machine gun cloche, one grenade launcher cloche, one twin machine gun cloche, one twin machine gun embrasure, two 75mm/31cal gun embrasures and two 81mm mortar embrasures, firing to the southwest.
Block 3 (artillery): one machine gun cloche, one twin machine gun cloche, one twin 76mm/31cal retractable gun turret and one twin machine gun embrasure. The turret has a 360-degree field of fire from the summit.
Block 4 (observation): one observation cloche, two machine gun embrasures.

A fifth block with four 81mm mortars was never built. Three observation posts were associated with l'Agaisen, including the petit ouvrage Champ de Tir de l'Agaisen.

History
During the Italian invasion of France in June 1940 the 75mm turret fired more than 1800 shots in support of French forces. The heavy machine gun cloche in Block 2 fired on Italian forces in the area of the advanced post at Castes-Ruines. The ouvrage took fire from Italian 305mm artillery without significant damage. A crater caused by an Italian bomb existed until the 1990s.

Some of the fort's armament was removed under the terms of the 25 June 1940 armistice, but the ouvrage was maintained by French forces through the war, albeit in a militarily decommissioned capacity. l"Agaisen was occupied by German forces after their withdrawal from the war in 1943, remaining until the allied invasion of Southern France in 1944. The Germans fired on advancing American forces with the 75mm turret in October, abandoning the position on October 28, 1944 after sabotaging some of the equipment. The American 442nd Infantry Regiment, composed of mostly Japanese-American soldiers, occupied the site in November 1944. During fighting around Authion in April 1945 the 75mm turrets of l'Agaisen and Monte Grosso were used in support of American and French forces in the area. An abundance of French 75mm ammunition, incompatible with American 76mm guns, encouraged the reconditioning and used of the turret guns.

After the war l'Agaisen was reconditioned using equipment from Barbonnet and Castillon. Equipment was upgraded through the 1950s and new mortars were delivered in 1962. Through the 1980s the position was kept under care of the Army with a view to preservation. In 1992 the Groupe Technique Agaisen (GTA) was formed to collaborate on preservation and restoration. L'Agaisen was transferred to the ownership of the town of Sospel in 2007.

L'Agaisen may be visited during open days or by prior arrangement.

See also
 List of Alpine Line ouvrages

References

Bibliography 
Allcorn, William. The Maginot Line 1928-45. Oxford: Osprey Publishing, 2003. 
Kaufmann, J.E. and Kaufmann, H.W. Fortress France: The Maginot Line and French Defenses in World War II, Stackpole Books, 2006. 
Kaufmann, J.E., Kaufmann, H.W., Jancovič-Potočnik, A. and Lang, P. The Maginot Line: History and Guide, Pen and Sword, 2011. 
Mary, Jean-Yves; Hohnadel, Alain; Sicard, Jacques. Hommes et Ouvrages de la Ligne Maginot, Tome 1. Paris, Histoire & Collections, 2001.  
Mary, Jean-Yves; Hohnadel, Alain; Sicard, Jacques. Hommes et Ouvrages de la Ligne Maginot, Tome 4 - La fortification alpine. Paris, Histoire & Collections, 2009.  
Mary, Jean-Yves; Hohnadel, Alain; Sicard, Jacques. Hommes et Ouvrages de la Ligne Maginot, Tome 5. Paris, Histoire & Collections, 2009.

External links 
 Mount Agaisen Fortress website in English
 Mont Agaisen website in French (with more detail)
 Ouvrage de l'Agaisen at Les Sentinelles des Alpes 
 Agaisen (gros ouvrage) at fortiff.be 

LAGA
Maginot Line
Alpine Line
World War II museums in France